The Petsamo expeditions were two military expeditions in May 1918 and in April 1920 by Finnish civilian volunteers, to annex Petsamo from Bolshevist Russia.  It was one of the many "kinship wars" (Heimosodat) fought by the newly independent Finland during the Russian Civil War. Although both expeditions were unsuccessful, Petsamo was handed over by Russia to Finland in the 1920 Treaty of Tartu.

The expeditions 
The goal of these raiders was to take Petsamo for Finland, which had previously been promised to Finland by Tsar Alexander II in 1864, in exchange for land around the Sestra River on the Karelian Isthmus transferred to Russia to build a weapon factory. The Bolsheviks were opposed to fulfill the Russian Tsar's earlier promises, which contributed to a deterioration in relations between the newly independent Finland and the recently formed Soviet Union. 

The 1918-expedition, still during the First World War, was composed of about 100 men and was led by doctors Thorsten Renvall and Onni Laitinen. They were opposed by the British Navy, who wanted to prevent the German Army from following in the wake. The British sent HMS Cochrane with naval Infantry and 40 Red Army soldiers.   
After some fighting, the expedition had to return without reaching its destination. 

The 1920-expedition, some 60 men headed first by General Kurt Martti Wallenius and then by Major Gustaf Taucher, met with resistance from Soviet troops, and also returned without accomplishing its goals.

Aftermath 

In the Treaty of Tartu, signed on 14 October 1920, Petsamo was handed over by Russia to Finland and became the Petsamo Province.

Source
 This is a translation of an article in the Finnish Wikipedia, Petsamon retket.

Wars involving Finland
Russian Civil War
1918 in Finland
1920 in Finland
Finland–Russia relations
Finland–Soviet Union relations
History of Murmansk Oblast